Master Tara Singh Memorial College for Women is located in Ludhiana, Punjab and it was established in 1968 in memory of Master Tara Singh who was a visionary for women education at that time. It offers Bachelor's degree in Computers, Commerce, Business Administration and Arts. The college is affiliated to Panjab University, Chandigarh.

References

External links

Women's universities and colleges in Punjab, India
Education in Ludhiana
Educational institutions established in 1968
1968 establishments in Punjab, India